No Todo Lo Puedes Dar is the third album of Mexican singer and actress Ximena Sariñana.

History 

Track listing

Deluxe Edition

CD 1

CD 2

DVD

References

External links 
 Ximena Sariñana - Official website of the singer (in Spanish)

2014 albums
Ximena Sariñana albums
Spanish-language albums
Warner Music Mexico albums